Trupanea wheeleri is a species of tephritid or fruit flies in the genus Trupanea of the family Tephritidae.

Distribution
Canada & United States.

References

Tephritinae
Insects described in 1933
Diptera of South America